Edward Charles Lange (October 12, 1887 – ?) was an American football player.  He was appointed to the United States Naval Academy in 1905 from Medford, Wisconsin.  While attending the Naval Academy, he played at the quarterback position for the Navy Midshipmen football team and was a consensus first-team selection on the 1908 College Football All-America Team. Lange also played on the Navy Midshipmen baseball team from 1907 to 1909.

References

1887 births
Year of death missing
American football quarterbacks
Navy Midshipmen baseball players
Navy Midshipmen football players
All-American college football players
People from Medford, Wisconsin
Players of American football from Wisconsin
Baseball players from Wisconsin
Military personnel from Wisconsin